Luan Jujie (born 14 July 1958) is a Chinese-born Canadian fencer, born in Nanjing, China. At the 1984 Summer Olympics in Los Angeles, she became the first Chinese athlete to win the gold medal in fencing. Since moving to Edmonton, Alberta, Canada in 1985, she has become a Canadian citizen. At the age of 50, Luan represented Canada at the 2008 Summer Olympics. She has also participated in the 1988 and 2000 Summer Olympics.

Career
Being an outstanding athlete in her youth, she had already done well in track and badminton before switching to fencing. She started fencing at the age of 17 and in no time joined the national team in the same year. Luan quickly rose in the international ranking capturing 2nd in the 1978 World Junior Championships (first Asian athlete to enter since 1901) and golds at the 1979 Chinese National Games, 1983 International Women's Fencing Tournament (first East Asian fencer to ever win an international event) and 1984 World Championships. She competed for the Chinese National Fencing Team in the 1984 Summer Olympics in Los Angeles when she was 26 years old and she became the first East Asian person to ever win an Olympic Gold in the sport of fencing. She also competed in the 1988 Summer Olympics for China.

Throughout her fencing career, she was noted for her toughness, once even continuing a match after being stabbed in the arm by a broken foil. She also struggled with kidney problems throughout her career.

Luan eventually moved to Edmonton, Alberta. She first came to Edmonton for the 1983 Summer Universiade and "fell in love with the city" so much that she moved to Edmonton in 1989 where she had three children. She started teaching at the Edmonton Fencing Club and was fundamental in the club's growth expanding it from a mere 40 members in 1989 to over 400 members today. She became a Canadian citizen in 1994.

She continued competing in fencing events in Canada and in the Fencing World Cup winning 4 Canadian National Championships in 1995, 1996, 1997 and 1999. In 2000, she qualified for her third Olympic Games in Sydney, Australia despite her age at the time of 42. She eventually lost in the preliminary rounds. She actively trained at the EFC and fenced in numerous competitions in hopes of gaining a berth on the 2008 Canadian Olympic team, which she succeeded in accomplishing.

Back in China, she is still often studied in textbooks, and has even had a movie made about her life. In 1999 she was named one of China's top 35 sports stars since the founding of the People's Republic of China in 1949.

Luan has qualified for the 2008 Beijing Olympics for Team Canada. On 11 August 2008, Jujie won her first round 13–9 win against the higher ranked Tunisian fencer Inès Boubakri, but ultimately had a 15–7 loss to Hungary's Aida Mohamed, 32, who was ranked seventh in the world.

References

1958 births
Living people
Canadian female foil fencers
Chinese emigrants to Canada
Canadian sportspeople of Chinese descent
Chinese female foil fencers
Fencers at the 1984 Summer Olympics
Fencers at the 1988 Summer Olympics
Fencers at the 2000 Summer Olympics
Fencers at the 2008 Summer Olympics
Naturalized citizens of Canada
Olympic fencers of Canada
Olympic fencers of China
Olympic gold medalists for China
Olympic medalists in fencing
Sportspeople from Nanjing
Medalists at the 1984 Summer Olympics
Asian Games medalists in fencing
Fencers at the 1978 Asian Games
Fencers at the 1986 Asian Games
Asian Games gold medalists for China
Asian Games silver medalists for China
Medalists at the 1978 Asian Games
Medalists at the 1986 Asian Games
Universiade medalists in fencing
Nanjing Sport Institute alumni
Fencers from Jiangsu
Universiade gold medalists for China